Abeyta is an extinct town in Las Animas County, in the U.S. state of Colorado. The GNIS classifies it as a populated place.

History
A post office was established at Abeyta in 1914, and closed within that same year. The community was named after Mrs. Abeyta, the mother of one Casimiro Barela.

References

Geography of Las Animas County, Colorado
Ghost towns in Colorado